Blue Ridge Independent School District is a public school district based in Blue Ridge, Texas (USA). Located in Collin County, the district extends into a very small portion of southwestern Fannin County.

Finances
As of the 2010–2011 school year, the appraised valuation of property in the district was $122,029,000. The maintenance tax rate was $0.117 and the bond tax rate was $0.050 per $100 of appraised valuation.

Academic achievement
In 2017, the school district was rated Met Standard by the Texas Education Agency.  No state accountability ratings were given to districts in 2012.

Historical district TEA accountability ratings
2017: Met Standard
2016: Met Standard
2015: Met Standard
2014: Met Standard
2013: Met Standard
2012: N/A
2011: Recognized
2010: Recognized
2009: Recognized
2008: Academically Acceptable
2007: Academically Acceptable
2006: Academically Acceptable
2005: Academically Acceptable
2004: Academically Acceptable

Schools
In the 2016–2017 school year, the district had students in three schools.
Regular instructional
Blue Ridge High (Grades 9–12)
Blue Ridge Middle (Grades 6–8)
Blue Ridge Elementary (Grades PK-5)

Closed campuses
N/A

Special programs

Athletics
Blue Ridge High School participates in the following UIL Class 3A sports:

 Football
 Volleyball
 Basketball
 Baseball
 Softball
 Track & Field
 Cross Country
 Tennis
 Golf
 Powerlifting

See also

List of school districts in Texas
List of high schools in Texas

References

External links
 

School districts in Collin County, Texas
School districts in Fannin County, Texas